Qezel Darreh (also Romanized as Qezeldarreh) is a village in Horr Rural District, Dinavar District, Sahneh County, Kermanshah Province, Iran. At the 2006 census, its population was 64, in 19 families.

References 

Populated places in Sahneh County